Deborah B. McGregor (Anishinaabe) is a Canadian environmentalist. She is an associate professor and Canada Research Chair in Indigenous Environmental Justice at Osgoode Hall Law School.

Early life and education
An Ojibway person from Whitefish River First Nation, McGregor  was born in Birch Island, Ontario, to Elder Marion McGregor. She earned her PhD in Forestry from the University of Toronto.

Career
After earning her PhD, McGregor was an assistant professor in Aboriginal Studies and Geography at the University of Toronto where she also served as Interim Director of the Centre for Aboriginal Initiatives. McGregor also worked at Environment Canada-Ontario Region as a Senior Policy Advisor. In 2010, McGregor co-edited "Indigenous Peoples and Autonomy: Insights for a Global Age" with Mario Blaser, Ravi De Costa, and William D. Coleman.

She was promoted to a full-time faculty member at Osgoode Hall Law School on July 1, 2015. The next year, she was renewed as a Tier 2 Canada Research Chair in Indigenous Environmental Justice, which allowed her to continue working on York's Indigenous Environmental Justice Project. Her research focus is understanding Indigenous environmental justice through a lens of unity between humanity and the environment.

In 2018, McGregor and co-editors Jean-Paul Restoule and Rochelle Johnston published "Indigenous Research: Theories, Practices, and Relationships," a book exploring research methodologies centred in Indigenous worldviews. She also sat on the Assembly of First Nations Advisory Committee on Climate Action and the Environment and attended the "Reconnecting with Mother Earth" gathering with 80 Elders and youth.

Her research focuses on Indigenous knowledge systems and how they can be applied for water and environmental governance, environmental justice, forest policy and management, and sustainable development.

Personal life
McGregor and her husband Steve have two sons together.

Journal Publications 
 From 'Trust' to 'Trustworthiness': Retheorizing dynamics of trust, distrust and water security in North America. (2022). Environment and Planning E. Nature and Space. http://dx.doi.org/10.1177/25148486221101459 
 Exposing the myths of household water insecurity in the global north: A critical review. (2020). Wiley Interdisciplinary Reviews: Water 7 (6). http://dx.doi.org/10.1002/wat2.1486 
 Including Indigenous Knowledge Systems in Environmental Assessment: Restructuring the Process. (2019). Global Environmental Politics 19 (3), 120-132. http://dx/doi.org/10.1162/glep_a_00519 
 Mino-Mnaamodzawin: Achieving Indigenous Environmental Justice in Canada. (2018). Environment and Society 9 (1). https://doi.org./10.3167/ares.2018.090102 
 Reconciliation and environmental justice. (2018). Journal of Global Ethics 14 (2). http://dx.doi.org/10.1080/17449626.2018.1507005 
 Shifting the Framework of Canadian Water Governance through Indigenous Research Methods: Acknowledging the Past with an Eye on the Future. (2018). Water 10 (1), 49. http://dx.doi.org/10.3390/w10010049 
 Source Water Protection Planning for Ontario First Nations Communities: Case Studies Identifying Challenges and Outcomes. (2017). Water 9 (7), 50. http://dx.doi.org/10.3390/w9070550 
 Recommendations for marine herring policy change in Canada: Aligning with Indigenous legal and inherent rights. (2016). Marine Policy 74. http://dx.doi.org/10.1016/j.marpol.2016.09.007 
 Traditional Ecological Knowledge: An Anishinaabe Woman's Perspective. (2005). Atlantis 29 (2). https://journals.msvu.ca./index.php/atlantis/article/view/1057 
 Coming Full Circle: Indigenous Knowledge, Environment, and Our Future. (2004). American Indian Quarterly 28 (3/4), 385-410. https://jstor.org/stable/4138924

Books 
 Indigenous Research: Theories, Practices, and Relationships (Canadian Scholars' Press, 2018). ISBN 9781773380858  
 Indigenous Peoples and Autonomy: Insights for a Global Change (UBC Press, 2011). ISBN 9780774817936

Contributions to books 
 "COVID-19 and First Nations' Responses," In Vulnerable: The Law, Policy and Ethics of COVID-19 (University of Ottawa Press, 2020). 
 "Truth Be Told: Redefining Relationships through Indigenous Research," In Renewing Relationships: Indigenous Peoples and Canada (Indigenous Law Centre, 2019).

References 

Living people
21st-century Canadian non-fiction writers
Canadian women non-fiction writers
21st-century Canadian women writers
Canadian women academics
Academic staff of the Osgoode Hall Law School
Canada Research Chairs
Ojibwe people
Academic staff of the University of Toronto
University of Toronto alumni
York University alumni
Canadian women environmentalists
Canadian environmentalists
First Nations activists
First Nations women
First Nations academics
Year of birth missing (living people)